The 2019–20 Bayer 04 Leverkusen season was the 116th season in the football club's history and 41st consecutive and overall season in the top flight of German football, the Bundesliga, having been promoted from the 2. Bundesliga Nord in 1979. In addition to the domestic league, Bayer Leverkusen also participated in this season's editions of the domestic cup, the DFB-Pokal, and the top-tier continental cup, the UEFA Champions League, as well as the UEFA Europa League. This was the 61st season for Leverkusen in the BayArena, located in Leverkusen, North Rhine-Westphalia, Germany. The season covered a period from 1 July 2019 to 10 August 2020.

Players

Squad information

Transfers

Transfers in

Loans in

Transfers out

Loans out

Pre-season and friendlies

Competitions

Overview

Bundesliga

League table

Results summary

Results by round

Matches
The Bundesliga schedule was announced on 28 June 2019.

DFB-Pokal

UEFA Champions League

Group stage

UEFA Europa League

Knockout phase

Round of 32

Round of 16

Quarter-finals

Statistics

Appearances and goals

|-
! colspan=14 style=background:#dcdcdc; text-align:center| Goalkeepers

|-
! colspan=14 style=background:#dcdcdc; text-align:center| Defenders

|-
! colspan=14 style=background:#dcdcdc; text-align:center| Midfielders

|-
! colspan=14 style=background:#dcdcdc; text-align:center| Forwards

|-
! colspan=14 style=background:#dcdcdc; text-align:center| Players transferred out during the season

References

Bayer 04 Leverkusen seasons
Leverkusen
Bayer Leverkusen